Cédric Houssaye (born 13 December 1979 in Trouville-sur-Mer) is a French race walker. He competed in the 50 kilometres walk event at the 2012 Summer Olympics.

References

1979 births
Living people
People from Trouville-sur-Mer
French male racewalkers
Olympic athletes of France
Athletes (track and field) at the 2012 Summer Olympics
Sportspeople from Calvados (department)